Konak Ferry Terminal (or Konak Vapur İskelesi) to differentiate it from the older Konak Pier, is a passenger ferry terminal in central Konak, İzmir on the Gulf of İzmir. It is located at the west end of the Kent Tarihi Park, west of Konak Square and Mustafa Kemal Sahil Boulevard. İzdeniz operates commuter ferry service to destinations in Karşıyaka, Bayraklı, Balçova as well as within Konak.

The original Konak Terminal was opened on 14 April 1938 and was located inland on Konak Square. The existing structure was built in the 1980s, when the city municipality redesigned Konak Square and constructed Mustafa Kemal Sahil Boulevard along a reclaimed coast.

Overview

İzdeniz operates a ferry service to seven other terminals along the east İzmir bay. These terminals are: Karşıyaka, Pasaport, Alsancak, Bostanlı, Göztepe, Üçkuyular and Bayraklı. A total of 99 ferries depart and arrive at the terminal every weekday. The majority of these ferries operate to Karşıyaka with 52 daily. Weekends still see many ferries but not as much as on weekdays.

The terminal building itself has of two levels. The lower level is for passengers and consists of a waiting hall, ticket booths and turnstiles while the upper floor consists of a cafe and bakery. A coffee house and news kiosk are located outside, directly in front of the building.

Connections
ESHOT operates city bus service on İnönü Avenue. In the following table the stop İskele refers to Konak Ferry Terminel.

Alsancak Ferry Terminal

References

Transport in İzmir
Ferry terminals in Turkey
Buildings and structures in İzmir
1938 establishments in Turkey
Buildings and structures completed in 1938
Konak District
Gulf of İzmir